Manuel Olmedo Villar (born 17 May 1983) is a Spanish middle-distance runner. He specialises in the 800 metres. He represented Spain at the Olympic Games at both the 2004 Athens Games and 2008 Beijing Olympics. He also ran at the World Championships in Athletics in 2003, 2007 and 2009.

Olmedo has won medals at the European Athletics U23 Championships. His personal best in the 800 m is 1:45.13.

Career
Born in Seville, Olmedo started his career with performances at junior level, competing at the 2000 World Junior Championships in Athletics. He was knocked out at the heats stage of the 2002 European Athletics Indoor Championships but he reached the final at the 2002 World Junior Championships, taking eighth place in 1:56.73.

The 2003 season marked a breakthrough for Olmedo as he took fifth in the European Athletics Indoor Cup and won the 800 m bronze medal at the 2003 European Athletics U23 Championships. He was the runner-up in the Spanish national championships that year behind Antonio Manuel Reina, gaining himself qualification into the 2003 World Championships in Athletics. At his first World Championships he was fourth in his heat, running 1:47.98, but this was not enough to qualify. Olmedo reached the Olympic stage the following year but again finished fourth in his heat, being knocked out of the 2004 Athens Olympics.

In his last appearance in non-senior competition, he won the silver medal at the 2005 European Athletics U23 Championships. He reached the 800 m semi-finals at the 2006 European Athletics Championships, but was eliminated after he finished in fourth place. He did not get past the heat stages at the 2007 European Athletics Indoor Championships, but managed to reach the semi-finals at the 2007 World Championships in Athletics in Osaka, Japan, but his near-personal best time of 1:45.61 was only enough for fifth. After recording a personal best of 1:45.13 at the Rieti IAAF Grand Prix, he was invited to the 2007 IAAF World Athletics Final and finished in sixth place. He reached the semi-finals twice at the global level in 2008 – finish fifth in his semi-final at the 2008 IAAF World Indoor Championships, and just missing out on the 800 m Olympic final at the 2008 Beijing Games (having run 1:45.91 for fourth).

He had his best performance at senior level at the 2009 European Athletics Indoor Championships, where he reached the final and finished in fifth place. He failed to match this performance at the 2009 World Championships in Athletics, however, as he did not manage to finish his heat.

Competition record

References

External links

Interview from European Athletics

1983 births
Living people
Sportspeople from Seville
Spanish male middle-distance runners
Athletes (track and field) at the 2004 Summer Olympics
Athletes (track and field) at the 2008 Summer Olympics
Olympic athletes of Spain
European Athletics Championships medalists
21st-century Spanish people